Estadio Nuevo Mirador is the Municipal Stadium of Algeciras, Spain. It is the home stadium of the football club, Algeciras CF. The stadium with a capacity for 7,200 spectators, and measuring 105 by 68 metres, is a modern sports complex located in the industrial area of La Menacha, and also houses the offices of the club. The new stadium was inaugurated in 1999, replacing an earlier stadium which was used from 1954 until 1999.

Links
Estadios de España

References

Buildings and structures in Algeciras
Sports venues completed in 1999
Football venues in Andalusia
1999 establishments in Spain
Sport in Algeciras